Carsten Ball and Robert Smeets were the defenders of championship title, but they chose not to defend their 2009 win.
Sanchai Ratiwatana and Sonchat Ratiwatana defeated Víctor Estrella and João Souza (6–3, 6–3).

Seeds

Draw

Draw

References
 Main Draw

Abierto Internacional Varonil Club Casablanca - Doubles
2009 Doubles